Leptolalax eos, also known as the Rosy Litter Frog, is a species of frog in the family Megophryidae. It is known in Bo Kluea District in northern Thailand; Phongsaly, Bolikhamxay, Oudomxai and Xaisomboun Provinces in Laos; Dien Bien, Thanh Hoa and Son La Provinces in northwestern Vietnam, and Yunnan, China. It was previously confused with Leptolalax bourreti.

References

eos
Amphibians described in 2011